Oleg Nikolayevich Yefremov (1 October 1927, Moscow, Soviet Union – 24 May 2000, Moscow, Russia) was a Soviet and Russian actor and Moscow Art Theatre producer. He was a People's Artist of the USSR (1976) and a Hero of Socialist Labour (1987).

In 1949, he graduated from Moscow Art Theatre School and became an actor and later a producer of the Central Children Theater, started teaching at School-Studio by himself.

Oleg Yefremov debuted as a film actor in the melodrama The First Echelon in 1955. Since then he was regularly acting in films, and his every appearance on screen turned to be a real event for millions of spectators. Some of his most notable roles were in the films The Alive and the Dead (1964), melodrama Three Poplars in Plyushchikha (1967), Shine, Shine, My Star (1969), comedies Aybolit-66 (1966), and Beware of the Car (1966).

In 1956, having gathered around himself students and graduates of the School-Studio, both his coevals and pupils, Oleg Yefremov organized the Studio of Young Actors (subsequently — the Moscow famous Sovremennik Theatre and became its first director. Since 1970 he was an actor and a Chief Producer of the Moscow Art Theatre named after Maxim Gorky. In 1976 the actor became a Professor of Moscow Art Theatre School-Studio.

Biography

Early life
Oleg Nikolayevich Yefremov was born on 1 October 1927 in Moscow. His father was Nikolai Ivanovich Yefremov, his mother Anna Dmitrievna Efremova.

He grew up in a large communal apartment on the Arbat Street. His father served as an accountant in the Gulag system, and the future actor spent a part of his adolescence in the Vorkutlag camps, where he became closely acquainted with the criminal world.

In childhood Yefremov attended a drama club at the House of Pioneers.

Theatre
He graduated from the School of the Moscow Art Theatre School in 1949.

From 1949 to 1956, Yefremov worked at the Central Children's Theater, where he played more than 20 roles, including Ivan ("Humpbacked Horse"), Coviel ("The Philistine in the Nobility"), Kostya Poletayev ("Pages of Life"), Alexey ( "In a good time!"). There he also made his debut as a director of the production of vaudeville "Dimka the Invisible" (1955).

In 1956, Oleg Yefremov organized the "Young Actors Studio" (later - the Moscow Theater "Sovremennik") and became the artistic director of the theater. On the stage of "Contemporary" he played in the performances "Forever Living" (Boris), "Destination" (Lyamin), "Nobody" (Vincenzo De Pretore). Among his directorial works are Five Evenings by Alexander Volodin, Eduard Rostan's Cyrano de Bergerac, Leonid Zorin's Decembrists trilogy, Alexander Svobin's Narodovoltsy, Mikhail Shatrov's Bolsheviks, Victor Rozov's Traditional Collection, Chekhov.

In 1970, Yefremov became the chief director of the Moscow Art Theater. After the division of the troupe in 1987 - the main stage director of the Moscow Art Theatre. For thirty years in the Art Theater, he has staged more than 40 performances and himself played in 14 of them. Among his works - "Dulcinea Tobosskaya" (the role of Don Luis), "Copper Grandmother" (Pushkin's role), "Duck hunting" (Zilov's role), "Party Committee Meeting" (Potapov's role), "Boris Godunov" (the title role). He staged Anton Chekhov's plays: "Ivanov" (1976), "The Seagull" (1980), "Uncle Vanya" (1985), "The Cherry Orchard" (1989), "The Three Sisters" (1997). His last, unfinished, directorial work was "Cyrano de Bergerac".

Film
Oleg Yefremov played about 70 roles in feature and television films, the most famous of which are: The First Echelon by Mikhail Kalatozov, The Soldiers were Advancing by Leonid Trauberg, The Alive and the Dead by Alexander Stolper, Someone Is Ringing, Open the Door by Alexander Mitta, Beware of the Car by Eldar Ryazanov, Three Poplars in Plyushchikha by Tatyana Lioznova and Battalions ask for Fire by Vladimir Chebotarev and Alexander Bogolyubov.

Other activities
Since 1949, Oleg Yefremov taught acting in the Moscow Art Theater School-Studio, produced several acting and director's courses, was a professor and head of the acting department.

He was one of the founders and the first secretary of the board of the Union of Theatre Workers of the Russian Federation.

Death
Oleg Yefremov died on 24 May 2000 in Moscow. He was buried at the Novodevichy Cemetery.

Personal life
Oleg Yefremov was married to Sovremennik Theatre actor Alla Pokrovskaya. Their son Mikhail is also an actor.

In popular culture
In the 2013 television series The Thaw, Oleg Yefremov was portrayed by his grandson, Nikita Yefremov.

Selected filmography

1955: The First Echelon (Первый эшелон) - Alexey Uzorov
1960: Probation (Испытательный срок) - Ulyan Grigorievich Zhur
1961: Mission (Командировка)
1961: Lyubushka (Любушка) — Olimp Ivanovich Lutoshkin, rider
1962: My Little Brother (Мой Младший Брат) — Viktor Yakovlevich Denisov, scientist, Dima's older brother
1964: The Alive and the Dead (Живые и мёртвые) - Captain Ivanov
1965: War and Peace (Война и мир) - Dolokhov
1965: Someone Is Ringing, Open the Door (The Girl and the Bugler) (Звонят, откройте дверь) - Dresvyannikov
1966: Beware of the Car (Берегись автомобиля) - Maxim Podberezovikov
1967: Straight Line (Прямая линия) - Colonel
1967: Three Poplars in Plyushcikha (Три тополя на Плющихе) - Sasha
1966: Aybolit-66 (Айболит-66) - doctor Aybolit
1968: Once More About Love (Ещё раз про любовь) - Kartsev
1969: King the Deer (Il re cervo) (Король-олень) - Durandarte
1970: Shine, Shine, My Star - Fedor, artist
1970: The Flight (Бег) - Colonel
1970: The Polynin Case (Случай с Полыниным) - Polynin
1971: All The King's Men (Вся королевская рать) - Adam Stanton
1972: Hello and Goodbye (Здравствуй и прощай) - Burov
1974: Moscow, My Love (Москва, любовь моя) - Doctor
1976: Rudin (Рудин) - Rudin
1976: Surgeon Mishkin's Days (Дни хирурга Мишкина, TV mini series) - Mishkin
1977: Open Book (Открытая книга) - Marlin
1977: Rudin (Рудин) 
1978: When I Will Become a Giant (Когда я стану великаном) - school inspector
1979: Poem of Wings (Поэма о крыльях) - Sergey Rakhmaninov
1980: The Imaginary Invalid (Мнимый больной) - Argan
1980: Once Upon a Time Twenty Years Later (Однажды двадцать лет спустя) - Painter
1984: Another Man's Wife and a Husband under the Bed (Чужая жена и муж под кроватью) - Alexander Demyanovich
1985: Battalions Ask for Fire (Батальоны просят огня) - Colonel Gulyayev
1986: The Secret of the Snow Queen (Тайна Снежной Королевы) - Fairy Tale’s Voice
1990: The Hat (Шапка) — Pyotr Nikolaevich Lukin, Organizing Secretary of the Moscow branch of the Writers' Union
1991: And the wind returns... (И возвращается ветер…) — Sergei Iosifovich Yutkevich
1995: Shirli-Myrli (Ширли-мырли) - Nikolai Grigorievich, neighbor of the Krolikovs
1998: Compositions for Victory Day (Сочинения ко Дню Победы) — Dmitry Kilovatov
1998: Chekhov and Co. (“Holy Simplicity” / “In a Foreign Land”) (Чехов и Ко.) — Father Savva Zhezlov / landowner Kamyshov

Honours and awards

 USSR State Prize, three times;
1969 - a stage trilogy Decembrists, Narodnaya Volya, Bolsheviks 
1974 - for the performance Steelworkers by Gennady Bokarev
1983 - for the play "So we will win!" by Mikhail Shatrov
 Honored Art Worker of the RSFSR (1967)
 People's Artist of the RSFSR (1969)
 People's Artist of the USSR (1976)
 "Golden Mask" - prize-looking actors of the Moscow theaters (1976)
 Union TV Festival Jury Prize in Leningrad (Days of the surgeon Mishkin, 1976)
 Order of the Red Banner of Labour (30 September 1977)
 Order of Lenin (1987)
 Order of Friendship of Peoples (1993)
 Hero of Socialist Labour (1987)
 Order "For Merit to the Fatherland", 3rd class (1997)
 Crystal Turandot Award (1997) - for valiant service to the theatre
 State Prize of the Russian Federation, twice
1997 - to maintain and develop the traditions of Russian psychological theatre in the play Three Sisters by Anton Chekhov
2003 (posthumous)
 Luspekayev prize for Lady Luck at the film festival Kinoshock in Anapa (1997)
 Golden Aries award (1997) - for his contribution to cinema
 Special Jury Prize of the National Theatre Award Golden Mask (1998) - for the play Three Sisters by Anton Chekhov
 Moscow Mayor's Award for a unique contribution to culture (1999)

References

External links
 
 Biography of Oleg Yefremov 

1927 births
2000 deaths
20th-century Russian male actors
Male actors from Moscow
Communist Party of the Soviet Union members
Academic staff of High Courses for Scriptwriters and Film Directors
Moscow Art Theatre School alumni
Academic staff of Moscow Art Theatre School
Heroes of Socialist Labour
People's Artists of the RSFSR
People's Artists of the USSR
Recipients of the Order "For Merit to the Fatherland", 3rd class
Recipients of the Order of Friendship of Peoples
Recipients of the Order of Lenin
Recipients of the Order of the Red Banner of Labour
Recipients of the USSR State Prize
State Prize of the Russian Federation laureates
Russian drama teachers
Russian male film actors
Russian male stage actors
Theatre directors from Moscow
Soviet drama teachers
Soviet male film actors
Soviet male stage actors
Soviet theatre directors
Burials at Novodevichy Cemetery